Grizzly Bear Creek is a stream in the U.S. state of South Dakota.

Grizzly bears once roamed the area, hence the name.

See also
List of rivers of South Dakota

References

Rivers of Custer County, South Dakota
Rivers of Pennington County, South Dakota
Rivers of South Dakota